Mylor Churchtown is a coastal village in Cornwall, England. It is the church town of the ecclesiastical parish of Mylor and is situated at the mouth of Mylor Creek, approximately three miles north of Falmouth.

Mylor Yacht Harbour is a large yacht marina immediately north of Mylor Churchtown. It has been owned by the Graffy family since 1997.

The marina is at the mouth of Mylor Creek at its confluence with Carrick Roads and is the home of Restronguet Sailing Club.

Parish church

Mylor parish church (Anglican) is in Mylor Churchtown and is dedicated to St Melorus. The church has Norman origins and is built on a cruciform plan, with a south aisle was added in the 15th century. There is a small west tower but the bells (three in number, the earliest dated 1637) are in a detached campanile. One of these bells bears the Latin inscription EGO ME PRECO SE CLAMANDO CONTERIMUS AUDITE VENITE (i.e. Ego me, praeco se clamando conterimus; audite, venite − "I wear myself out, as the town-crier wears himself out, by clamouring; give ear [and] come".

Features of interest include 13th-century carving of the Crucifixion outside the north transept, a 15th-century pillar piscina and the Elizabethan pulpit. The well preserved rood screen has the painted inscription in Cornish: "IARYS IONAI JESW CREST" (explained as a corrupt repainting of "MARYA JOHANNES JESUS CHRIST", i.e. Mary, John (the Evangelist), Jesus Christ). There are monuments to Francis Trefusis, one of the MPs for Penryn in 1679, dated 1680. and to Reginald Cocks (1805) by Richard Westmacott. A more recent memorial in the shape of a screen remembers the 31 victims of the Darlwyne disaster of 1966. A pleasure boat had been chartered from Greatwood, a then hotel near Restronguet, to take guests on a day trip to Fowey. She set out on the return voyage but was never seen again. The vicar, Frank Martin, played a significant role in helping the bereaved families. The wreck of the Darlwyne was reportedly found near Dodman Point on 31 July 2016 (exactly 50 years after its disappearance) by divers collaborating with the makers of the BBC's Inside Out South West.

The cross in the churchyard is the largest in Cornwall (10 ft high). The cross was only identified as such in 1870 as it had been buried head downwards in the earth so that the part above ground could serve as a post. The stone is 17 ft 6 in long and there is a local tradition that it marked the site of St Mylor's grave not far from the place where it was found. It is thought to be of pre-Christian origin. It was set up as it is now by sailors from HMS Ganges.

Thomas Peter's gravestone is the oldest in the churchyard; he was Vicar of Mylor but as a Parliamentarian, he was driven out of Cornwall by Royalists and became the first minister at the settlement of New London afterwards returning to Mylor. There is also "a stone with a ship engraved on it, in memory of people drowned in the year before Waterloo" (Arthur Mee in  Cornwall, 1937). This is for the over 250 victims of the shipwreck of the Queen, wrecked at Trefusis Point on a voyage from Spain to England.

References

External links

Villages in Cornwall
Populated coastal places in Cornwall
Marinas in England